Viktor Georgiyevich Mazanov (born 8 March 1947) is a retired Russian swimmer who competed in nine events at the 1964, 1968 and 1972 Summer Olympics. He won two silver and two bronze medals in freestyle and medley relays in 1968 and 1972. He also won one silver in two gold medals in relays at the European championships of 1966 and 1970. During his career he set one world record (4×100 yd medley, 1964) and 13 European (1965–1970) and 26 national (1962–1972) records.

References

1947 births
Living people
Russian male swimmers
Russian male freestyle swimmers
Male backstroke swimmers
Olympic swimmers of the Soviet Union
Swimmers at the 1964 Summer Olympics
Swimmers at the 1968 Summer Olympics
Swimmers at the 1972 Summer Olympics
Olympic silver medalists for the Soviet Union
Olympic bronze medalists for the Soviet Union
Olympic bronze medalists in swimming
European Aquatics Championships medalists in swimming
Medalists at the 1972 Summer Olympics
Medalists at the 1968 Summer Olympics
Olympic silver medalists in swimming
Universiade medalists in swimming
Universiade gold medalists for the Soviet Union
Medalists at the 1965 Summer Universiade
Soviet male freestyle swimmers